{{DISPLAYTITLE:C3H7O7P}}
The molecular formula C3H7O7P (molar mass: 186.06 g/mol, exact mass: 185.9929 u) may refer to:

 2-Phosphoglyceric acid, or 2-phosphoglycerate
 3-Phosphoglyceric acid